"Tom's Diner" is a song written in 1982 by American singer and songwriter Suzanne Vega. It was first released as a track on the January 1984 issue of Fast Folk Musical Magazine. Originally featured on her second studio album, Solitude Standing (1987), it was released as a single in Europe only in 1987 following the success of her single "Luka". It was later used as the basis for a remix by the British group DNA in 1990, which reached No. 1 in Austria, Germany, Greece and Switzerland.

The song is known for its use in testing various digital compression schemes during the development of the MP3, earning Vega the title of "Mother of the MP3".

Original version

Background and writing

The "Tom's Diner" of the song is Tom's Restaurant in New York City, a mid-20th-century diner on the northeast corner of Broadway and West 112th Street. Singer and songwriter Suzanne Vega was reputedly a frequent patron during the early 1980s when she was a student at nearby Barnard College. The diner later became famous as the location used for the exterior scenes of Monk's Café in the popular 1990s television sitcom Seinfeld.

The song begins with the narrator stopping at a diner for a cup of coffee. The song mentions reading a newspaper as well as seeing two women, one who enters the diner and one who stands outside in the rain. The ringing of bells at a nearby cathedral causes the narrator to reminisce about an unnamed companion and a midnight picnic. At the end of the song, the narrator leaves the diner to catch the train after the coffee is finished.

Vega wrote the song based on a comment by her friend Brian Rose, a photographer, who mentioned that in his work, he sometimes felt as if "he saw his whole life through a pane of glass, and [...] like he was the witness to a lot of things, but was never really involved in them". She attempted to think and write in this fashion (including a male perspective) while sitting at Tom's Restaurant. The "bells of the cathedral" that she remarks hearing in the song are those of the Cathedral of St. John the Divine, located one block to the east.

"Tom's Diner Day": The date of the composition
An article on Suzanne Vega's official website uses clues in the song to determine the exact date that Vega wrote it.

Vega said that she wrote the song in 1982; Brian Rose has said that it was written sometime between mid-1981 and mid-1982. The lyrics refer to a rainy morning, when she was at the diner on the corner, reading in her newspaper of "a story of an actor / who had died while he was drinking", and afterwards "turning to the horoscope / and looking for the funnies". Only two newspapers in New York City carried comic strips, or "funnies", in 1981 and 1982, and only one, the New York Post, featured a front-page story of the death of Oscar-winning actor William Holden, whose body was discovered on Monday, November 16, 1981. In a 2008 essay for The New York Times, Vega confirmed that Holden was the actor whose death she had read about and inspired the line in the song.

Music and lyrics
Vega conceived "Tom's Diner" as a piece for voice and solo piano. Two versions feature on her album Solitude Standing; the album opens with an a cappella version, and closes with an instrumental version played on keyboards, with guitars lending support.

During the 2006 Major League Baseball season, Cincinnati Reds player Ryan Freel used this song as his entrance song when he came to bat.

The "Mother of the MP3"
An article in the now defunct magazine Business 2.0 revealed that "Tom's Diner" was also used by Karlheinz Brandenburg to develop the audio compression scheme known as MP3 at what is now the Fraunhofer Society. He recalled: "I was ready to fine-tune my compression algorithm...somewhere down the corridor, a radio was playing 'Tom's Diner.' I was electrified. I knew it would be nearly impossible to compress this warm a cappella voice."

In a 2009 documentary about the history of the song by Swedish SVT, Brandenburg said: "I was finishing my PhD thesis, and then I was reading some hi-fi magazine and found that they had used this song to test loudspeakers. I said 'OK, let's test what this song does to my sound system, to MP3'. And the result was, at bit rates where everything else sounded quite nice, Suzanne Vega's voice sounded horrible."

Brandenburg adopted the song for testing purposes, listening to it again and again each time he refined the scheme, making sure it did not adversely affect the subtlety of Vega's voice. While the MP3 compression format is not specifically tuned to play the song "Tom's Diner" (an assortment of critically analyzed material was involved in the design of the codec over many years), among audio engineers this anecdote has earned Vega the informal title "The Mother of the MP3".

Track listings
 12-inch maxi
 "Tom's Diner"
 "Left of Center"
 "Tom's Diner" 
 "Luka"

Charts

DNA remix

Background

In 1990, two British record producers under the name DNA remixed "Tom's Diner", grafting Vega's vocals onto a dance beat from Soul II Soul ("Keep On Movin'") and turning her simple ad-libbed outro – "Do do do uh, do da-do uh" – into the song's driving hook. It was impossible to get a whole song into a sampler, so they spent evenings and weekends cutting Vega's vocals into little bits. Without permission from Vega, her record label, or publisher, the duo released the remix on a limited basis for distribution to clubs as "Oh Suzanne" by "DNA featuring Suzanne Vega". Vega's record company of the time, A&M, decided to buy and release the remix rather than take DNA to court for copyright infringement.

A&M struck the deal after consulting with Vega, who liked the interpretation, and DNA, who conducted the transaction through intermediaries without revealing their true identities. Vega told a British columnist, "(A&M) asked me what I thought of it and I told them it was really kind of nice. So I said, 'Go ahead and release it.' I wasn't expecting it to be successful-I never thought it would be that popular. It just seemed very charming." The remix became a much larger hit than Vega had with the song originally, peaking at number two on the UK Singles Chart and number five on the US Billboard Hot 100, and it became one of a handful of tracks to chart in the top 10 of both the Modern Rock Tracks (number seven) and Billboard R&B/Hip-Hop Tracks (number ten) charts. The remix also reached number one in Austria, Germany, Greece and Switzerland. A music video was also made of this version.

Composition
The remix of the song is written in the key of F minor in common time with a tempo of 99 beats per minute.  Vega's vocals span from F3 to E4 in the song.

It was certified Gold in Germany in 1990.

Critical reception
Larry Flick from Billboard commented, "Don't miss the exceptional "Tom's Diner", by DNA featuring Suzanne Vega." He noted that the Brit outfit had placed "a slammin' Soul II Soul-flavored swing instrumental" underneath Vega's song, and also described the track as "indelibly infectious." Student newspaper Columbia Daily Spectator named it a "surprise hit". Marisa Fox from Entertainment Weekly complimented its dance beat as "mesmerizing". Patrick Goldstein from Los Angeles Times said, "Strange but true-almost." He added that the "waif-like pop songstress" has suddenly become the "queen of London's trendy club scene, thanks to her sinewy, Soul II Soul-style dance hit". Everett True from Melody Maker commented, "This is so f***ing smooth. You know the original, I'm sure Suzanne's unaccompanied tale of everyday morning life in the big city in the wake of a break-up, incisively, poignantly observed. Magical. Now imagine it set to an unobtrusive, mellow backbeat which slips down even easier. F***ing superb! What is it about today? Single of the week. No shit."	

A reviewer of Music & Media found that "the lonely vocal part is perfectly complemented by the Steely Dan type horns and the grinding hip-hop beat. A fine version." Music Week ranked the song number-one in their Top 10 list, Pick Of The Year - Dance. Diane Tameecha from The Network Forty felt the connection of Vega's "sensuously soft voice and the unlikely rhythm (for her music, anyway) is startlingly vibrant, and its jazziness is an instant ear-catcher." Mandi James  from NME named it Single of the Week, writing, "A strange record, if only for the fact Suzanne Vega has previously failed to move me in anyway, except to get up and leave the room. Dropped against a sensual, tactile beat those irritatingly vacant girly vocals are miraculously transformed into a hypnotic, bitter sweet ballad. The crushing folking bore has been given a new lease of life and should be eternally grateful to plastic surgeons DNA. The nearest thing to perfection I've heard all week." Smash Hitss reviewer said remixes like this one "end up sounding far better than the originals and the result is rather refreshing." Alec Foege from Spin remarked that "Tom's Diner" was an international hit "only after DNA did a dance remix".

Music video
A music video was made to accompany the song. It was directed by Gareth Roberts.

Track listings
 CD maxi "Tom's Diner"  – 3:47
 "Tom's Diner" by Suzanne Vega – 2:39
 "Tom's Diner"  by Suzanne Vega – 2:08
 "Tom's Diner"  – 5:20

 7-inch single "Tom's Diner" – 3:47
 "Tom's Diner"  by Suzanne Vega – 2:08

 12-inch maxi "Tom's Diner"  – 6:03, This version, containing a piano with a solo part, has never been released on CD or MP3 yet.
 "Tom's Diner" by Suzanne Vega
 "Tom's Diner"  by Suzanne Vega

 Cassette single'''
 "Tom's Diner" 7-inch version by Suzanne Vega (side 1)
 "Tom's Diner" 12-inch version by Suzanne Vega (side 2)

Charts and certifications

Weekly charts

Year-end charts

Certifications

Giorgio Moroder version

For the release of his fourteenth studio album Déjà Vu on June 12, 2015, record producer Giorgio Moroder included a remake of the song, featuring American singer Britney Spears on his album as the eighth track. It was later released as the album's fourth and final single on October 9, 2015, with two new remixes included, marking the second release from Spears in 2015, following "Pretty Girls", and additionally her first featuring participation since "S&M (Remix)" in 2011.

Despite being a non-single track at that time, it became Moroder's best-selling digital song to date, debuting and peaking at number 38 on the Billboard Dance/Electronic Songs chart, and number fourteen on the Billboard Dance/Electronic Digital Songs chart, during the week of July 4, 2015.

Track listing
 "Tom's Diner" – 3:32
 "Tom's Diner" (Leu Leu Land Remix) – 2:58
 "Tom's Diner" (Hibell Remix) – 3:17

Сharts

Release history

AnnenMayKantereit and Giant Rooks version

German groups AnnenMayKantereit and Giant Rooks covered the song in 2019. The cover went viral on TikTok in March 2022, reaching more than 120 million views on TikTok and 45 million streams on Spotify.

Charts
Weekly charts

Year-end charts

Certifications

Remakes and samples

Remakes
The song spawned a number of hip hop, dance, and rock remixes and remakes from artists such as Peter Behrens (drummer from Trio) and Bingo Hand Job, a whimsical one-time collaboration between Billy Bragg and R.E.M.  It was also sampled in songs by Public Enemy, Nikki D, 2Pac, Twin Hype, Yo Gotti and Lil' Kim, among other hip hop acts.

In 1991, Vega, noting the huge number of remakes of the song, released Tom's Album, a compilation of different versions of the song, spanning a variety of musical genres, including a parody by Mark Jonathan Davis that worked in references to I Dream of Jeannie'' called "Jeannie's Diner", which Nick-at-Nite would use to promote its airings of the show. The album also featured another DNA remix of one of her songs, "Rusted Pipe". On the album's sleeve, Vega wrote: "A small song about eating breakfast became a song about accidental pregnancy (Daddy's Little Girl – Nikki D.) and the recent war in the Gulf (Waiting at the Border). One version incorporates forgotten bits of pop culture (Jeannie's Diner). All of them surprised me; a couple made me wince. I include them anyway."

In 2015, sound artist and composer Ryan Maguire released the track "moDernisT" (an anagram of "Tom's Diner") as a part of his project "The Ghost in the MP3". "moDernisT" is composed exclusively of the sounds deleted during MP3 compression from the song "Tom's Diner", known as the mother of the MP3. A detailed account of the techniques used to isolate the sounds deleted during MP3 compression, along with the conceptual motivation for the project, was published in the 2014 Proceedings of the International Computer Music Conference.

In 2020, English producer Robbie Doherty remixed the song with artist Keees, titling it "Pour the Milk", launching it to No. 44 on the UK Singles Chart.

Samples
American rock band Fall Out Boy used an interpolation of "Tom's Diner" in their song "Centuries".

In 2022, music duo Sofi Tukker sampled the song on their single "Summer in New York".

References

External links
'Tom's Essay' - Suzanne Vega explains how the song came to be
Mike Dreams - Tha Diner
Writeup containing Vega's a cappella version in the prelude to which she speaks of the song

Suzanne Vega songs
1982 songs
1987 singles
1990 debut singles
DNA (duo) songs
A cappella songs
Number-one singles in Austria
Number-one singles in Germany
Number-one singles in Greece
Number-one singles in Switzerland
Songs about New York City
Test items
A&M Records singles
PolyGram singles
Britney Spears songs
Giorgio Moroder songs
Songs based on actual events
Trip hop songs
New jack swing songs
Dance-pop songs
Songs about actors